Katarína Horáková (born 12 October 1934), published in English speaking countries as Katarina Horak, is a professor of biology at the Faculty of Chemical and Food Technology, Slovak University of Technology in Bratislava, Slovakia.

She was born in 1934 in Bratislava, which was then part of Czechoslovakia.

Bibliography
2012 - Body Detox, English, pages 82
2012 - Body Detox (Detoxikácia organizmu - 6th extended edition), Slovak, pages 132
2011 - Warning Signals of the Body (Varovné signály tela), Slovak, pages 300
2010 - Art of Healthy Living (Umenie zdravo žiť - 2nd edition), Slovak, pages 240
2010 - Body Detox (Detoxikácia organizmu - 5th edition), Slovak, pages 84
2010 - Body Detox (A szervezet méregtelenítése - 2nd edition), Hungarian, pages 84
2009 - Art of Healthy Living (Umenie zdravo žiť - 1st edition), Slovak, pages 240
2009 - Body Detox (Detoxikácia organizmu - 4th edition), Slovak, pages 84
2008 - Body Detox (Detoxikácia organizmu - 3rd edition), Slovak, pages 84
2008 - Body Detox (A szervezet méregtelenítése - 1st edition), Hungarian, pages 84
2008 - Body Detox (Detoxikáce organizmu), Czech, pages 84
2008 - Body Detox (Detoxikácia organizmu - 2nd edition), Slovak, pages 84
2007 - Body Detox (Detoxikácia organizmu - 1st edition), Slovak, pages 84
2005 - The Health Monitor (Monitor zdravia), Slovak, pages 200
2002 - Separated Diet Cleansing Treatments and Portioning (Oddelená strava - Očistné kúry a diéty), Slovak, 2 editions, pages 68
2001 - Separated Diet Recipes and Portioning (Oddelená strava - Recepty a diéty), Slovak, 6 editions (2001–2002), pages 68
2001 - The Separated Diet – And Now What? (Dělená strava - A co dále?), Czech, 3 editions (2001–2002), pages 144
2001 - Don‘t Be Afraid of Health (Nebojme se zdraví), Czech, 3 editions (2001–2002), pages 144
2001 - The Separated Diet – And Now What? (Oddelená strava - A čo ďalej?), Slovak, 4 editions (2001–2002), pages 144
1999 - Don‘t Be Afraid of Health (Nebojme sa zdravia), Slovak, 6 editions (1999–2002), pages 144
1998 - The Separated Diet (Dělená strava), Czech, 8 editions (1998–2002), pages 144
1998 - The Separated Diet (Oddelená strava), Slovak, 10 editions (1998–2002), pages 144

Publications

 in

Notes

References 

Symptoms of bowel problems – diarrhoea, constipation, Author: Katarina Horak
Detoxification of the body, Author: Katarina Horak
Flat stomach / Flat belly, Author: Katarina Horak
Inflammation of the colon - Diverticulitis, Author: Katarina Horak
A well functioning digestive system – the foundation of health, Author: Katarina Horak
Všeobecná biológia, 1989, 1989 (General Biology - in Slovak), authors: Katarína Horáková, Vladimír Frank, Pavel Nemec, Edition 2, Publisher: Faculty of Chemical and Food Technology, Slovak University of Technology in Bratislava, Slovakia, 1989, 247 pages
Biológia, 1991 (Biology - in Slovak), Publisher: Faculty of Chemical and Food Technology, Slovak University of Technology in Bratislava, Slovakia, 224 pages
Mikrobiológia: Návody na cvičenia, 1993, (Microbiology - in Slovak, authors: Katarína Horáková, Helena Baráthová, Valter Vollek, Contributor: Faculty of Chemical and Food Technology, Publisher: Slovak University of Technology in Bratislava, Slovakia, 211 pages
Biológia, 1996 (Biology - in Slovak), Publisher: Faculty of Chemical and Food Technology, Slovak University of Technology in Bratislava, Slovakia, 67 pages
Spectrum - Slovak Technical University Monthly Magazine, page 20 - Book introduction and official presentation of Art of Health Life (Umenie zdravo žiť, 2009) by the dean of Faculty of Chemical and Food Technology prof. Dušan Bakoš.
Most important Slovak Internet book distributor Martinus.sk
 (in Slovak).

External links 
 Katarina Horak homepage

1934 births
Living people
Slovak biologists
Academic staff of the Slovak University of Technology in Bratislava
Scientists from Bratislava